Lebanon's  first appearance in the Olympics was in 1936 when a "delegation of officials" attended the Summer Olympics in Berlin.  Following the formation of the Lebanese Olympic Committee in 1947, Lebanon participated for the first time at the Olympic Games in 1948, and has sent athletes to compete in all but one Summer Olympic Games since then. Lebanon was one of four nations to boycott the 1956 Games in protest of the British and French involvement in the Suez Crisis. Lebanon has also participated in most Winter Olympic Games since 1948, missing only the 1994 and 1998 Winter Games.

Lebanon also participated at the 1st Youth Olympic Games 2010 in Singapore.

Lebanese athletes have won four medals, three in Greco-Roman wrestling and one in weightlifting.

The Lebanese Olympic Committee, i.e. the National Olympic Committee for Lebanon, was created in 1947 and recognized by the International Olympic Committee in 1948.

Medal tables

Medals by Summer Games

Medals by Winter Games

Medals by summer sport

Medalists

See also
 List of flag bearers for Lebanon at the Olympics
Sport in Lebanon
 :Category:Olympic competitors for Lebanon

References

External links